League of Extraordinary G'z (sometimes stylized as LOEGz) was an American hip hop group from Austin, Texas. They released their debut album #LeagueShit in 2013.

Career
LOEGz have worked with well-known artists including Rittz and Devin the Dude. In 2010, LOEGz performed at South by Southwest and Fun Fun Fun Fest. On October 15, 2013, the group released #Leagueshit, their self-released debut studio album with features from Dead Prez, Grupo Fantasma and Slim Gravy of A.Dd+.

Discography

Albums
The Plug (2012)
 #LeagueShit (2013)

References

External links
Official website
Official Twitter
Official Facebook
Official SoundCloud

American hip hop groups
American hip hop record producers
Southern hip hop groups
Musical groups from Austin, Texas
Rappers from Texas
Record production teams
Hip hop collectives